Marsh Green may refer to:

Marsh Green, Devon, in England
Marsh Green, Kent, in England
Marsh Green, East Sussex, in England
 Marsh Green, Isle of Wight, in England
Marsh Green, Wigan, in England